Anaz (also spelled Aanaz) is a village in northern Syria located west of Homs in the Homs Governorate. According to the Syria Central Bureau of Statistics, Anaz had a population of 2,038 in the 2004 census. Its inhabitants are predominantly Christians. The village has a Greek Orthodox Church and a Greek Catholic Church.

References

Bibliography

 

Populated places in Talkalakh District
Christian communities in Syria